WPSF (91.5 FM) is a radio station licensed to Clewiston, Florida, United States. The station is currently owned by Call Communications Group, Inc.

References

External links
 

PSF